San Luis Fútbol Club was a Mexican professional football club from the city of San Luis Potosí, Mexico. The club was founded in 1957, when they were known as Santos (saints). The team's nickname of Tuneros, a reference to the tuna fruit, was later changed to Gladiadores. The nickname for the team was then changed to Reales. The nickname Tribu Real is a reference to the fact that the team was once named Real San Luis. Another nickname recently given to the team is El Equipo del Milagro (The Miracle team) because of the last-minute "miracle" to stay in the highest division.  San Luis play their home games at Alfonso Lastras Ramirez Stadium. On May 28, 2013 it was confirmed the team would move to Tuxtla Gutiérrez, Mexico and be renamed Chiapas Fútbol Club.

History
The team began playing the Tercera Division de Mexico where they were able to win the 1969–70 season gaining promotion to Segunda Division.

In the 1970–71 season San Luis was able to win Segunda Division. This automatically gave them the promotion to go to Primera Division for the 1971–72 season.

Their stint in Primera Division  was cut short after losing the relegation playoff against Laguna in the 1973–74 season.

It did not take long for San Luis to once again win Segunda Division and in 1975–76 they achieved the title and the right for promotion for the 1976–77 season. This would lead to the Potosino classic in the top flight since Atlético Potosino had achieved promotion in the 1973–74 season as semi finalist.

Once again their stay in Primera Division did not last long. In the end of a great season in 1976–77 where they reached the championship playoff, the franchise was sold to Tampico Madero who took over their spot in Primera Division.

The team returned to Primera Division in the 2002–03 season, ending in the mid-table position. This stint was short-lived, since in the tournaments after that they did not do well, and they ended up being relegated after the 2003–04 season.

Their last stint in Primera Division was in the 2005–06 season, when they gain promotion after winning the 2004–05 Primera 'A'.

After the 2012–13 season Querétaro was relegated to the Ascenso MX after accumulating the lowest coefficient over the past three seasons. Querétaro would have been replaced by the 2012 Apertura Ascenso MX champion La Piedad, who won promotion after defeating the Clausura 2013 winner Neza in a promotional play-off. However, on May 28, 2013, Querétaro's ownership announced that it bought out Jaguares de Chiapas and relocated the team to Querétaro, dissolving the old Querétaro team and ensuring that Querétaro would still have a team in the first division. It was also announced that San Luis would move to Tuxtla Gutiérrez and be renamed Chiapas F.C., replacing the new outgoing Querétaro. Finally, La Piedad confirmed that they would also relocate to Veracruz and be renamed as Veracruz. These changes have sparked controversy in the Mexican press as Querétaro effectively bought its place back in the first division and newly promoted La Piedad completely lost its team. With this San Luis was left without a team in top flight now having only Atlético San Luis, was formed in 2013, in Ascenso MX.

Honours

National
  Primera División A: (2)
Verano 2002, Apertura 2004
  Campeón de Ascenso: (2)
2002, 2005
 Segunda División de México: (2)
1970-71, 1975–76
 Tercera División de México:
1969-70

Club records
 Seasons in 1st: 26
 Seasons in 2nd: 4
 Most Goals in Favor: 6–3 vs UNAM (27-Oct-2002)
 Most Goals Against: 1–6 vs América (31-Oct-1971)
 Best Position in Table: 1º (Apertura 2008)
 Worst Position in Table: 19º
 Best Scorer:   Oscar Ariel González Mezzenasco (51 Goals)
 GK with less goals against:  Adrián Martínez
 Most Games Played:  Adrián Martínez  (160 Games)

Top goalscorers

 Players in bold are currently active with San luis.
 Players in italic are still active but are not currently with  San Luis.

Managers
  Juan Antonio Luna (July 2002 – March 3)
  Abel Alves (July 2003 – Oct 03)
  Wilson Graniolatti (Oct 2003 – March 4)
  Carlos Reinoso (2004)
  Cristóbal Ortega (2005)
  Raúl Arias (Nov 2005 – Dec 08)
  Luis Scatolaro (Jan 2009 – June 9)
  Juan Antonio Luna (July 2009 – Oct 09)
  Miguel Ángel López (Oct 2009 – Dec 09)
  Ignacio Ambriz (Jan 2010 – Dec 11)
  Isidoro García (Jan 2012 – Feb 12)
  Sergio Bueno (Feb 2012 – May 12)
  José Luis Trejo (July 2012 – Aug 12)
  Álex Aguinaga (Aug 2012 – Nov 12)
  Eduardo Fentanes (Jan 2013 – Feb 13)
  Carlos María Morales (Feb 2013 – March 13)
  Gerardo Silva (March 2013 – May 13)

References

External links

Official site
Hinchas Web

 
San Luis
Association football clubs established in 2001
Association football clubs disestablished in 2013
Liga MX teams
Ascenso MX teams
2001 establishments in Mexico
2013 disestablishments in Mexico